Tom Barnes (born 14 November 1990) is a British artistic gymnast who represents his nation at international competitions. In 2012 he became the Scottish All Around Champion. He competed at the 2014 Northern European Gymnastics Championships in Denmark, Greve and won a Bronze medal on the floor exercise. He is training at Tolworth Gymnastics Club (United Kingdom), after coming out of retirement. Barnes is currently the men's head coach at Heathrow Gymnastics Club (United Kingdom). He has been coaching the Heathrow Men's Squad for three years and was the coach of the team who took the bronze medal at the 2015 men's artistic under 14 British Team Championships.

References

1990 births
Living people
British male artistic gymnasts